Vidova gora (780 m.a.s.l., some sources say 778m) is the highest peak on the island of Brač, Croatia, and also the highest peak on all Adriatic islands. It is situated above the village of Bol.

Sources
 Brač – vrh Vidova gora 

Mountains of Croatia
Brač
Bol, Croatia